The Federal Administrative Court of Switzerland is a Swiss federal court. It is the judicial authority to which decisions of the federal authorities of Switzerland can be appealed. The decisions of the Federal Administrative Court can generally be appealed, in turn, to the Federal Supreme Court of Switzerland.

Purpose 

The Federal Administrative Court was created with the federal judicial reform in 2005 to replace some thirty boards of appeal that exercised judicial oversight over the various departments of the federal administration. Up until 2007, the Swiss Federal Council, the supreme executive authority of Switzerland, also served as a final court of appeal in certain areas of administrative law. These judicial functions were also taken over by the Federal Administrative Court, ensuring that every decision of the administration can be reviewed in the last instance by an independent court of law.

Organisation 

The Federal Administrative Court is organised in six divisions with 73 judges in total:
 I: infrastructure, finance and personnel 
 II: economy, education and competition 
 III: foreigners, health and social security
 IV: asylum law 
 V: asylum law 
 VI: law concerning foreigners and citizenship 

The judges are elected by the Federal Assembly of Switzerland and serve for six years; reelections are possible. Since 2019, the president of the Federal Administrative Court is Marianne Ryter.

Seat 

The Federal Administrative Court took up work in Bern on 1 January 2007. It was relocated to its permanent seat in St. Gallen in summer 2012 after the construction of the court building there was completed.

Notes and references

See also
 List of judges of the Federal Administrative Court of Switzerland

External links 
 Website of the FAC in German, French or Italian
 English language booklet on the FAC published by the Court
 Federal Law of 17 June 2005 on the Federal Administrative Court in German, French or Italian

Administrative Court
Administrative courts
Buildings and structures in Bern
Modernist architecture in Switzerland
2005 establishments in Switzerland
Courts and tribunals established in 2005